Crenicichla taikyra is a species of cichlid native to South America. It is found in the middle río Paraná in Argentina.

References

taikyra
Fish of Argentina
Taxa named by Jorge Rafael Casciotta
Taxa named by Adriana Edith Almirón
Taxa named by Danilo Ramon Aichino
Taxa named by Sergio Enrique Gómez
Taxa named by Lubomír Piálek
Taxa named by Oldřich Říčan
Fish described in 1991